Glenavy is a small town in the South Island of New Zealand. It is located at the southern extreme of the Canterbury region on the alluvial fan of the Waitaki River, three kilometres from the river's outflow into the Pacific Ocean.

Glenavy was named for Glenavy, Northern Ireland, the birthplace of former New Zealand Premier John Ballance.

Demographics
The settlement is part of the larger Morven-Glenavy-Ikawai statistical area.

Glenavy had a population of 195 at the 2018 New Zealand census, a decrease of 6 people (-3.0%) since the 2013 census, and an increase of 66 people (51.2%) since the 2006 census. There were 105 households. There were 105 males and 90 females, giving a sex ratio of 1.17 males per female. The median age was 58.4 years (compared with 37.4 years nationally), with 18 people (9.2%) aged under 15 years, 30 (15.4%) aged 15 to 29, 78 (40.0%) aged 30 to 64, and 69 (35.4%) aged 65 or older.

Ethnicities were 87.7% European/Pākehā, 12.3% Māori, 9.2% Asian, and 1.5% other ethnicities (totals add to more than 100% since people could identify with multiple ethnicities).

Although some people objected to giving their religion, 43.1% had no religion, and 40.0% were Christian.

Of those at least 15 years old, 15 (8.5%) people had a bachelor or higher degree, and 60 (33.9%) people had no formal qualifications. The median income was $23,000, compared with $31,800 nationally. The employment status of those at least 15 was that 57 (32.2%) people were employed full-time, 21 (11.9%) were part-time, and 6 (3.4%) were unemployed.

Morven-Glenavy-Ikawai statistical area

Morven-Glenavy-Ikawai had a population of 1,095 at the 2018 New Zealand census, a decrease of 36 people (-3.2%) since the 2013 census, and an increase of 156 people (16.6%) since the 2006 census. There were 441 households. There were 597 males and 501 females, giving a sex ratio of 1.19 males per female. The median age was 36.3 years (compared with 37.4 years nationally), with 219 people (20.0%) aged under 15 years, 219 (20.0%) aged 15 to 29, 534 (48.8%) aged 30 to 64, and 126 (11.5%) aged 65 or older.

Ethnicities were 75.9% European/Pākehā, 8.8% Māori, 0.8% Pacific peoples, 19.2% Asian, and 2.5% other ethnicities (totals add to more than 100% since people could identify with multiple ethnicities).

The proportion of people born overseas was 24.7%, compared with 27.1% nationally.

Although some people objected to giving their religion, 46.8% had no religion, 36.2% were Christian, 5.2% were Hindu, 0.3% were Muslim, 1.9% were Buddhist and 2.5% had other religions.

Of those at least 15 years old, 141 (16.1%) people had a bachelor or higher degree, and 183 (20.9%) people had no formal qualifications. The median income was $40,600, compared with $31,800 nationally. 111 people (12.7%) earned over $70,000 compared to 17.2% nationally. The employment status of those at least 15 was that 528 (60.3%) people were employed full-time, 117 (13.4%) were part-time, and 24 (2.7%) were unemployed.

Education 
Glenavy School is a full primary school serving years 1 to 8, with a roll of  students as of  The school opened in 1889.

References

Waimate District
Populated places in Canterbury, New Zealand